Scinax constrictus is a species of frog in the family Hylidae.

It is endemic to Brazil.
Its natural habitats are dry savanna and freshwater marshes.
It is threatened by habitat loss.

References

constrictus
Endemic fauna of Brazil
Amphibians of Brazil
Frogs of South America
Amphibians described in 2004
Taxonomy articles created by Polbot